Terence Donnelly (born 1959 in Ballycastle, County Antrim) is an Irish former sportsman.  He played hurling with his local club McQuillans, Ballycastle and was a member of the Antrim senior inter-county team in the 1980s.

References

1959 births
Living people
Ballycastle McQuillan hurlers
Antrim inter-county hurlers
Ulster inter-provincial hurlers